Joseph Maffioli (18 February 1904 – 10 July 1965) was a French ski jumper. He competed in the individual event at the 1928 Winter Olympics.

References

External links
 

1904 births
1965 deaths
French male ski jumpers
Olympic ski jumpers of France
Ski jumpers at the 1928 Winter Olympics
People from Chamonix
Sportspeople from Haute-Savoie